James W. Huston served as mayor of Boise, Idaho Territory, from 1885 to 1887.

Huston was appointed mayor by the Boise City Council in November 1885 to complete the term of Sol Hasbrouck even though Huston was neither a member of the city council nor present at the meeting. He was sworn in more than a month later.

Sources
Mayors of Boise - Past and Present
Idaho State Historical Society Reference Series, Corrected List of Mayors, 1867-1996

Mayors of Boise, Idaho